Papacito lindo ("Cute Daddy") is a 1939 Mexican film directed by Fernando de Fuentes.

External links
 

1939 films
1930s Spanish-language films
Films directed by Fernando de Fuentes
Mexican black-and-white films
Mexican films based on plays
Mexican romantic comedy films
1939 romantic comedy films
1930s Mexican films